Inman Park / Reynoldstown is a train station in Atlanta, Georgia, serving the Blue Line of the Metropolitan Atlanta Rapid Transit Authority (MARTA) rail system. It also serves the Green Line on weekdays, and has two side platforms and two tracks. This station opened June 30, 1979.

The station primarily serves the communities of Inman Park and Reynoldstown and is located near the Edgewood Retail District. Bus service is provided at this station to Virginia-Highland, Little Five Points, East Atlanta Village, Georgia State University (Decatur), Georgia Department of Labor, Children's Healthcare of Atlanta at Egleston, Center of Disease Control (CDC), Emory University, Michael C. Carlos Museum, MTC and Emory University Hospital. 366 parking spaces are available on site.

Station layout

Nearby landmarks and popular destinations
Edgewood Retail District
Little Five Points Shopping District
Communities of Inman Park and Reynoldstown

Buses at this station
The station is served by the following MARTA bus routes:

North Bus Bays
 Route 6 - Clifton Road / Emory

South Bus Bays
 Route 4 - Moreland Avenue
 Route 32 - Bouldercrest
 Route 74 - Flat Shoals Road

References

External links 

MARTA Station Page
nycsubway.org Atlanta page
 Hurt Street entrance from Google Maps Street View
 Seaboard Avenue entrance from Google Maps Street View

Blue Line (MARTA)
Green Line (MARTA)
Metropolitan Atlanta Rapid Transit Authority stations
Railway stations in the United States opened in 1979
Railway stations in Atlanta
1979 establishments in Georgia (U.S. state)